The Sons of Rest is a social organisation that has provided leisure facilities for men of retirement age in and around Birmingham and the Black Country in the English West Midlands since 1927, and more recently for women.

The movement was established when a group of retired working men, veterans of World War I, met in Handsworth Park, Birmingham, in 1927. One of them, Lister Muff (1852-1938) proposed that they form a club. The name was suggested by W. J Ostler recognising that they had been "sons of toil" during their working years.

They originally met in an old cab drivers' shelter in the park in summer and the park's bowling pavilion in winter, but appealed for funding for their own building, where they could meet and play games such as cards, draughts and dominoes. Their appeal succeeded, and the first building was opened in Handsworth Park in 1930.

The appeal was supported by the chairman of Birmingham Corporation Parks Committee, Councillor George F. McDonald, who became the first president of "The City of Birmingham Federation of The Sons of Rest", on its inauguration in August 1932. The organisation's anthem, Sons of Rest, was written by one of the early members, Charles Smith, who was aged 81, and blind:

At its peak, the organisation had 3,000 members and 29 buildings, located in parks. A number of the buildings survive and are still in use.

The Handsworth building was replaced in 1937. A public campaign prevented its demolition in the 1990s and it was subsequently refurbished. It is now managed by The Friends of Handsworth Park A 2018 mosaic mural by Claire Cotterill, on an external wall, commemorates the movement.

Some branches such as that at Darlaston, rebranded as Sons & Daughters of Rest, and admit women.

Buildings 

|}

and others at:

 Coleshill
 Willenhall
 Hill Top, West Bromwich.

In addition to the above, other branches meet (or met) in hired premises. These include:

 Hamstead, Great Barr
 Eli-Fletcher, Oak Road, West Bromwich
 Lightwoods House, Smethwick

References

Further reading 

 

1927 establishments in England
Organisations based in Birmingham, West Midlands
Aftermath of World War I in the United Kingdom
History of Birmingham, West Midlands